Cesare Laurenti may refer to:

Cesare Laurenti (engineer),  Italian designer of naval craft
Cesare Laurenti (painter) (1854–1936), Italian artist